TCP/IP Illustrated is the name of a series of 3 books written by W. Richard Stevens.  Unlike traditional books which explain the RFC specifications, Stevens goes into great detail using actual network traces to describe the protocol, hence its 'Illustrated' title.

The first book in the series, "Volume 1: The Protocols", is cited by hundreds of technical papers in ACM journals.

Volumes

Volume 1: The Protocols
After a brief introduction to TCP/IP, Stevens takes a bottom-up approach by describing the protocol from the link layer and working up the protocol stack.  The Second Edition was published on 11/15/2011.

Volume 2: The Implementation
500 illustrations, combined with 15,000 lines of actual code from the 4.4BSD-Lite release, serves as concrete examples of the concepts covered in Volume 1.

Volume 3: TCP for Transactions, HTTP, NNTP, and the UNIX Domain Protocols
This volume goes into detail on four topics:

 T/TCP (TCP for Transactions)
 HTTP (Hypertext Transfer Protocol)
 NNTP (Network News Transfer Protocol)
 UNIX Domain Protocols (see Unix domain socket)

As with Volume 2, examples from 4.4BSD-Lite are used.

References

External links
 Author's page about Volume 1
 Author's page about Volume 2
 Author's page about Volume 3

Illustrated
Computer books
Addison-Wesley books